USS Trumbull, the third United States Navy ship to bear the name, was an 18-gun sloop-of-war that took part of the so-called Quasi-War between the United States and France, between 1800 and 1801.

Construction
US Congress authorized the construction of naval ships and expansion of the US Navy in response to large losses of merchant ships to French privateers throughout the Atlantic coasts. On 30 March 1799, Benjamin Stoddert ordered Howland & Allyn Naval Agency from New London, Connecticut, the construction of a 360-ton ship with no more than 18 guns, but big enough to carry supplies for 6-months of sailing and a crew of 120 men. The Trumbull was launched in Norwich, on the morning of 26 November of that same year.

Service history
Following fitting out, it departed New London in March 1800 under the command of Master Commandant David Jewett.  Its first mission was to escort the provisions ship Charlotte from New York to the West Indies, replenishing the American Squadron operating against the French.

Trumbull's main duties in the area were protection of American shipping and the interception of French privateers and merchantmen.

In early May 1800, she captured the armed French schooner Peggie. This may have been the schooner of six guns, that had been sailing from Port Republican to Bordeaux with 70,000wt. of coffee.

In August 1800 Trumbull, and were cruising near Aux Cayes.

On 3 (or 14) August, while off Jeremie in Saint-Domingue (future Haiti), Captain David Jewett and Trumbull captured the French schooner Vengeance. Vengeance was pierced for 10 guns but armed with eight 4-pounder guns and two in her hold. The schooner was fleeing Saint-Domingue with 130 people aboard, crew and refugees together. The refugees were mostly gens de couleur libres (also known as mulattos) escaping the forces of Toussaint Louverture who had defeated André Rigaud's army in the War of Knives. Talbot ordered Jewett home with Trumbull and Vengeance as a prize. Both ships arrived at New London late that summer. For a little less than a year, those aboard the Vengeance were stationed in Norwich, Connecticut as prisoners of war, and among them was Jean-Pierre Boyer, future president of Haiti. Vengeance was later condemned as a national vessel and was returned to France under the treaty soon afterwards concluded with that country.

Trumbull then returned to patrol off Santo Domingo, before later transporting Navy Agent Thomas T. Gantt to St. Kitts to relieve Thomas Clarkson.  Following the end of hostilities with France as a result of the Treaty of Mortefontaine, Trumbull returned to the United States in the spring of 1801, where her crew was paid off.

Disposal: Trumbull was sold at auction in New York in May or June 1801 for $26,500 to Messrs. Robinson and Harthorne, local merchants.

Notes

References

Bibliography
 Url
 

Sloops of the United States Navy
Quasi-War ships of the United States
1800 ships